The Evens are an ethnic group of Siberia and the Russia Far East.

Evens may also refer to:
Even numbers
Even odds (or 'evens'), when a bet will pay out one unit per unit wagered in the event of it winning
The Evens, Washington, DC, punk duo
The Evens (album), their self-titled debut album

People with the surname Evens include:
Bernt Evens (born 1978), Belgian footballer
Bob Evens (born 1947), English Anglican churchman
George Bramwell Evens (1884–1943), British radio broadcaster

See also
Even (disambiguation)
Evans (disambiguation)
Evens & Howard Fire Brick Co. of St. Louis, Missouri, United States